Arctops ("Bear face") is an extinct genus of gorgonopsian therapsids known from the Late Permian of South Africa. The type species is Arctops willistoni. A second species, A. watsoni, may be synonymous with A. willistoni. A. kitchingi may be a third species of Arctops, but it was only tentatively assigned to the genus when it was first named. Both were formally synonymized with A. willistoni by Christian Kammerer in 2017.

References

Gorgonopsia
Prehistoric therapsid genera
Lopingian synapsids of Africa
Fossil taxa described in 1914
Taxa named by D. M. S. Watson
Lopingian genus first appearances
Lopingian genus extinctions